
Corinne may refer to:

Places
 Corinne, Saskatchewan, Canada, an unincorporated community
 Corinne, Oklahoma, United States, an unincorporated community
 Corinne, Utah, United States, a town
 Corinne, West Virginia, United States, a census-designated place

People and fictional characters
 Corinne (name), a given name, including a list of people and fictional characters with the name
 Tee Corinne (1943–2006), American photographer, author, and editor
 Corinne Kimball, a performer best known as Corinne.

Other uses
 Corinne (horse), a 19th-century British Thoroughbred racehorse
 Corinne, an 1807 novel by Germaine de Staël

See also
 Corrine (disambiguation)
 Corrinne, given name
 Chorine, a female chorus girl
 Corine (disambiguation)
 Coreen